Christmas is the eighteenth full-length album by Canadian singer-songwriter Bruce Cockburn, released in 1993 by True North Records.

Track listing
All tracks traditional, arranged by Bruce Cockburn, except where noted.
"Adeste Fidelis" (John Francis Wade) – 0:52
"Early on One Christmas Morn" (Traditional) – 3:02
"O Little Town of Bethlehem" (Phillips Brooks, Lewis Redner) – 3:38
"Riu Riu Chiu" (Traditional) – 6:26
"I Saw Three Ships" (Traditional) – 4:19
"Down in Yon Forest" (Traditional) – 4:09
"Les Anges Dans Nos Campagnes" (Traditional) – 3:09
"Go Tell It on the Mountain" (Traditional) – 3:12
"Shepherds" (Bruce Cockburn) – 2:52
"Silent Night" (Franz Gruber, Joseph Mohr) – 4:10
"Jesus Ahatonnia (The Huron Carol)" – 6:33
"God Rest Ye Merry, Gentlemen" – 2:53
"It Came Upon the Midnight Clear" – (Edmund Sears, Richard Storrs Willis, arr. Sam Phillips) – 6:41
"Mary Had a Baby" (Traditional) – 4:42
"Joy to the World" (Lowell Mason) – 0:44

Album credits
Musicians
 Bruce Cockburn – vocals, guitar, percussion (tracks 4, 7, 14), dulcimer (tracks 4, 6, 7), harmonica (tracks 5, 7), wind chimes (track 6)
 Gary Craig – drums (tracks 2, 5, 8, 9, 10, 11), percussion (track 14), backing vocals (track 14)
 Colin Linden – guitar (track 2, 9), slide guitar (tracks 5, 8, 10), electric guitar (track 11), backing vocals (track 2)
 Richard Bell – piano (track 2), organ (tracks 5, 6, 8, 9, 10, 11, 13), accordion (tracks 7, 14), backing vocals (track 14)
 Dick Smith – percussion (tracks 2, 4, 6, 7, 11, 13, 14), backing vocals (track 14)
 Hugh Marsh – violin (tracks 4, 5, 6, 10, 11, 13)
 John Dymond – bass (tracks 5, 8, 9, 10, 11, 14), backing vocals (track 14)
 Colina Phillips – backing vocals (tracks 2, 8, 10)
 Sharon Lee Williams – backing vocals (tracks 2, 8, 10)
 Vivienne Williams – backing vocals (tracks 2, 8, 10)
 Alberto Mirabal – backing vocals (tracks 4, 7)
 Candi Sosa – backing vocals (tracks 4, 7)
 Eliseo Borrero – backing vocals (tracks 4, 7)
 Sam Phillips – backing vocals (tracks 9, 13)
 T-Bone Burnett – humming (track 5)
 Jenny Cockburn – backing vocals (track 7)

Production
 Bruce Cockburn – producer
 Joe Schiff – recording, mixing
 Eric Ratz – assistant engineer
 Mike Piersante – assistant engineer
 Greg Calbi – mastering
 Christopher Austopchuk, Sara Rotman – art direction
 David Katzenstein – photography

References

1993 Christmas albums
Bruce Cockburn albums
Christmas albums by Canadian artists
True North Records albums
Folk rock Christmas albums